Niem M. Green (born October 9, 1982), also known by his stage name The Daydreaming Mogul, Nye, and Nye the Daydreaming Mogul, is an American businessman, Internet entrepreneur, rapper, songwriter, author, motivational speaker, record producer and founder of creditscoredating.com. He was born and raised in Philadelphia, Pennsylvania. He worked as a credit underwriter at JPMorgan Chase and spent ten years in the financial sector. He specialized in lending, risk and credit analysis and project management before founding his online dating service Credit Score Dating in 2006. In 2009, he released The Daydreaming Mogul's Guide Vol. 1 Daydreams and Success. The book explored his philosophy on how to achieve one's desires through the power of daydreaming.

Early life 

Green was born on October 9, 1982, in Philadelphia, Pennsylvania. He was raised in Philadelphia by his mother Gwendolyn (Payne), a court clerk for the City of Philadelphia. Green moved to Delaware at the age of 17 and graduated from Christiana High School in Newark, Delaware in 2001. Green was a marketing major at Wilmington University in New Castle, Delaware and received his Bachelors of Science in 2013.

Career

2000: "JP Morgan Chase" 
In 2000, Green was hired as a credit analyst and was introduced to credit and lending at Chase Bank, where he worked until the events of 9/11.

2006: "Creditscoredating.com" 
In 2006, Green launched Creditscoredating, an online dating site that matched single by financial compatibility and credit scores.

2009: "The Daydreaming Mogul's Guide Volume 1 
In 2009, Green released The Daydreaming Mogul's Guide Vol. 1 Daydreams and Success, a non-fiction guide outlining how to set goals and define success for readers.

2013: "Fallen Soldiers - The Rise 
In 2013, Green released Fallen Soldiers The Rise, a coming of age novel centered around the tragedy of 9/11/2001. The novel was based loosely on events that affected Green's personal life.

2016: "The Daydreaming Mogul's Guide Volume:2 
In 2016, Green released, The Daydreaming Mogul's Guide Volume 2: Credit Score Dating - The Sexiness of Credit. The highly anticipated book that outlined the basis and reasoning behind green's site, Creditscoredating.

2017: Daydream Girl, Daydreaming Mogul's Guide Collector's Edition, and Young Mogul Magazine
In 2017, Green announced that he would be releasing an album to further engage millennials in the credit score dating brand and released the Hip-hop single "Daydream Girl". In December 2017 Green released Young Mogul Magazine digitally. In the same month, Green released a collector's edition of the 2 volumes of The Daydreaming Mogul's Guide, globally through Green Walk Media Group.

Business career and press

Chains Inc and The News Journal Awarded Green as one of the 40 top professionals under 40 in 2015.

In 2013 Green was featured on NBC's Today show making the first appearance to the world as the founder of the site creditscoredating.com 

In 2015 Green appeared alongside Geraldo Rivera on Fox Business News' Mornings with Maria where Green's site, Credit Score Dating was featured and the topic.

Personal life 
Currently, Green is father to three children from a previous relationship, two of which are step-children.

References

21st-century American businesspeople
American rappers
1982 births
Living people
21st-century American rappers